Heinrich Theodor Füls (born 8 March 1971) is a South African former rugby union player.

Playing career
Füls made his provincial debut for Transvaal in 1992. He also played for Eastern Province, Western Province and the Border Bulldogs in the South African domestic competitions.

He made his test debut for the Springboks as a replacement for James Small after 38 minutes in the second half in the test against the New Zealand All Blacks on 15 Augustus 1992 at Ellis Park in Johannesburg. Füls was capped 8 times in test matches for the Springboks and also played a further thirteen tour matches in which he scored one try for the Springboks.

Test history

See also
List of South Africa national rugby union players – Springbok no.  567

References

1971 births
Living people
South African rugby union players
South Africa international rugby union players
Rugby union centres
Golden Lions players
People from Tswelopele Local Municipality
Alumni of Grey College, Bloemfontein
Rugby union players from the Free State (province)